Sarahandrano is a commune in northern Madagascar. It belongs to the district of Antalaha, which is a part of Sava Region. According to 2001 census the population of Sarahandrano was 12,758.

Primary and junior level secondary education are available in town. The majority 99% of the population are farmers. The most important crops are rice and vanilla; also coffee is an important agricultural product. Services provide employment for 1% of the population.

Notes 

Populated places in Sava Region